Hoseynabad-e Sofla (also Romanized as Ḩoseynābād-e Soflá) is a village in Kelarestaq-e Sharqi Rural District, in the Central District of Chalus County, Mazandaran Province, Iran. At the 2006 census, its population was 1,344, in 343 families.

References 

Populated places in Chalus County